Delvin DeWayne James (born January 3, 1978) is an American former professional baseball pitcher in Major League Baseball who played for the Tampa Bay Devil Rays. 

James attended Nacogdoches High School in Nacogdoches, Texas where he was a five-sport star. He was the leading scorer on the school's basketball team, had a 1.43 earned run average, struck out 80 batters in 73 innings pitched and received a scholarship to play college football as a linebacker at Oklahoma State. He was a high school football teammate of Kynan Forney. He was drafted by the Devil Rays in the 14th round of the 1996 Major League Baseball draft. He was assigned to the Gulf Coast League to begin his professional career.

In September 2000, James and a minor league teammate helped apprehend a bank robber near the Tyrone Square Mall in St. Petersburg, Florida and returned $7,600 to a SouthTrust bank.

James was called up to the Major Leagues for the first time on April 15, 2002 after pitcher Wilson Álvarez was placed on the disabled list and Travis Phelps and Jason Smith were demoted. He made his Major League debut on April 16, 2002 against the Detroit Tigers at Comerica Park. He started the game and pitched five innings, allowed two earned runs and picked up the loss. On May 17, 2002, James was placed on the disabled list with right shoulder tendinitis.

At about 3 a.m. on September 2, 2002, James was shot three times in his non-pitching shoulder and elbow at a Waffle House in Raleigh, North Carolina. James was pitching for the nearby Durham Bulls at the time. The woman he was with was paralyzed after the shooting. Only twelve days later, James was back on Tampa Bay's Major League roster and pitching against the Toronto Blue Jays at SkyDome.

James pitched in what would be his final Major League game on September 29, 2002 against the Boston Red Sox. He pitched until 2005 in the farm systems of the Devil Rays and the Anaheim Angels.

In April 2006, James told Oklahoma State football coaches that he was planning to try to walk on to the team.

James is a cousin of basketball player Damion James.

References

External links

1978 births
Living people
American shooting survivors
Arizona League Angels players
Arkansas Travelers players
Baseball players from Texas
Charleston RiverDogs players
Durham Bulls players
Gulf Coast Devil Rays players
Hudson Valley Renegades players
Major League Baseball pitchers
Orlando Rays players
Princeton Devil Rays players
Salt Lake Stingers players
St. Petersburg Devil Rays players
Tampa Bay Devil Rays players
People from Nacogdoches, Texas